Jean-Michel Coron (born August 8, 1956) is a French mathematician. He first studied at École Polytechnique, where he worked on his PhD thesis advised by Haïm Brezis. Since 1992, he has studied the control theory of partial differential equations, and which includes both control and stabilization. His results concern partial differential equations related  to fluid dynamics, with emphasis on nonlinear phenomena, and part of them found applications to control channels.

He had previously worked in the field of non-linear functional analysis,  where he also obtained significant results. Jean-Michel Coron was awarded numerous prizes, like the Fermat prize in 1993, the Jaffé prize in 1995 by the Académie des Sciences, and the Dargelos prize in 2002.

He was invited at the 1990 International Congress of Mathematicians (Kyoto)  in the section Partial Differential Equations, and he was also invited as a plenary speaker at  the 2010 International Congress of Mathematicians, Hyderabad, India. He is now a Professor at the University Pierre et Marie Curie in Paris, and a Senior member of the  Institut Universitaire de France.

Jean-Michel Coron is the husband of Claire Voisin who was also plenary speaker at the 2010 International Congress of Mathematicians and who is the 2016 recipient of the Gold medal of the French National Centre for Scientific Research, the highest scientific research award in France. They have five children.

Notable publications
 Haïm Brezis and Jean-Michel Coron. Multiple solutions of H-systems and Rellich's conjecture. Comm. Pure Appl. Math. 37 (1984), no. 2, 149–187.
 Jean-Michel Coron. Topologie et cas limite des injections de Sobolev. C. R. Acad. Sci. Paris Sér. I Math. 299 (1984), no. 7, 209–212.
 H. Brezis and J.-M. Coron. Convergence of solutions of H-systems or how to blow bubbles. Arch. Rational Mech. Anal. 89 (1985), no. 1, 21–56.
 Haïm Brezis, Jean-Michel Coron, and Elliott H. Lieb. Harmonic maps with defects. Comm. Math. Phys. 107 (1986), no. 4, 649–705.
 A. Bahri and J.-M. Coron. On a nonlinear elliptic equation involving the critical Sobolev exponent: the effect of the topology of the domain. Comm. Pure Appl. Math. 41 (1988), no. 3, 253–294.
 A. Bahri and J.-M. Coron. The scalar-curvature problem on the standard three-dimensional sphere. J. Funct. Anal. 95 (1991), no. 1, 106–172.
 Jean-Michel Coron. Global asymptotic stabilization for controllable systems without drift. Math. Control Signals Systems 5 (1992), no. 3, 295–312.
 Jean-Michel Coron, Brigitte d'Andréa-Novel, and Georges Bastin. A strict Lyapunov function for boundary control of hyperbolic systems of conservation laws. IEEE Trans. Autom. Control 52 (2007), no. 1, 2–11.

References

External links 
 :fr:Institut universitaire de France Institut Universitaire de France (IUF)
 
 

1956 births
Living people
French mathematicians
University of Paris alumni
PDE theorists